Carlo Lombardi (2 January 1900 – 21 March 1984) was an Italian stage and film actor. Later in his career he often worked in television. He appeared in a number of films during the Fascist era, including a leading role in the historical epic Scipio Africanus (1937).

Selected filmography
 The Man with the Claw (1931)
 Pergolesi (1932)
 Zaganella and the Cavalier (1932)
 The Gift of the Morning (1932)
 Giallo (1933)
 Everybody's Woman (1934)
 The Anonymous Roylott (1936)
 Scipio Africanus (1937)
 The Last Enemy (1938)
 Star of the Sea (1938)
 A Wife in Danger (1939)
 The Castle Ball (1939)
 A Thousand Lire a Month (1939)
 The Dream of Butterfly (1939)
 The First Woman Who Passes (1940)
 Light in the Darkness (1941)
 L'attore scomparso (1941)
 The Secret Lover (1941)
 Headlights in the Fog (1942)
 Torrents of Spring (1942)
 Lively Teresa (1943)
 The Priest's Hat (1944)
 The Tyrant of Padua (1946)
 The Devil's Gondola (1946)
 The Lady of the Camellias (1947)
 Baron Carlo Mazza (1948)
 Il nido di Falasco (1950)
 Captain Phantom (1953)
 Orphan of the Ghetto (1954)
 It Takes Two to Sin in Love (1954)
 The Giant of Marathon (1959)
 Hawk of the Caribbean (1962)

References

External links

Bibliography
 Elley, Derek. The Epic Film: Myth and History. Routledge, 2013.

1900 births
1984 deaths
Italian male film actors
Italian male stage actors
20th-century Italian male actors